The Roman Catholic Diocese of Amravati is a diocese located in the city of Amravati in the Ecclesiastical province of Nagpur in India.

History
 8 May 1955: Established as Diocese of Amravati from the Metropolitan Archdiocese of Nagpur.

Leadership
 Bishops of Amravati (Latin Rite)
 Bishop-elect Elias Gonsalves (11 July 2012 – 3 Dec2018) now the apostolic administrator of the diocese
 Bishop Lourdes Daniel (8 June 2007 – 11 November 2010); he had also been the Apostolic Administrator of the Roman Catholic Diocese of Nashik; he was appointed Bishop of Nashik by Pope Benedict XVI on Thursday, 11 November 2010; at that time he was designated as the temporary Apostolic Administrator of Amravati until the new Bishop was chosen on Wednesday, 11 July 2012
 Bishop Edwin Colaço (12 May 1995 – 20 October 2006)
 Bishop Joseph Albert Rosario, M.S.F.S. (8 May 1955 – 12 May 1995)

References

External links
 GCatholic.org 
 Catholic Hierarchy 

Roman Catholic dioceses in India
Christian organizations established in 1955
Roman Catholic dioceses and prelatures established in the 20th century
Christianity in Maharashtra
Amravati district
1955 establishments in Bombay State